Roger Scales (born November 25, 1944) is a retired Canadian football player who played for the Edmonton Eskimos and Toronto Argonauts of the Canadian Football League (CFL). He played college football at Brigham Young University.

Scales is famous in Argonaut lore for scoring their only touchdown in the 1971 Grey Cup. On a fumbled punt by Calgary's Jim Silye, he took the lateral from Joe Vijuk and rumbled 33 yards into the end zone. The Argos would go on to lose the game 14-11.

References

1944 births
Living people
American football guards
Canadian football guards
American players of Canadian football
BYU Cougars football players
Toronto Argonauts players
Edmonton Elks players
Players of Canadian football from British Columbia
Sportspeople from Vernon, British Columbia